Gwangcheon station is a railway station in Gwangcheon-eup, Hongseong, South Chungcheong, South Korea, on the Janghang Line of Korail.

References

External links
 Cyber station information from Korail

Railway stations in South Chungcheong Province
Railway stations opened in 1923
Janghang Line
1923 establishments in Korea